Venable is a surname shared by several notable people:

 Venable Brothers, rock quarry business of Samuel and William Venable that included Stone Mountain, Georgia.
 Abraham B. Venable (1758–1811), American state and national politician
 Abraham Watkins Venable (1799–1876), American state and national politician
 Charles L. Venable (born 1960), former CEO of the Indianapolis Museum of Art in Indianapolis, Indiana
 Charles S. Venable (1827–1900), American mathematician, astronomer, academic, Confederate Civil War officer
 David Venable (born 1978), American intelligence officer, author, and businessman
 David Venable (television personality) (born 1964), American TV personality and QVC host
 Edward Carrington Venable (1853–1908), American national politician
 Evelyn Venable (1913–1993), American actress
 Francis Preston Venable (1856–1934), American chemist and academic
 James Venable (disambiguation), multiple people
 Max Venable (born 1957), former American professional baseball player
 Noe Venable (born 1976), American singer-songwriter
 Richard Venable (born 1944), American state politician
 Robert Venable (born 1981), American music recording engineer and producer
 Will Venable (born 1982), American baseball player
 William Henry Venable (1836–1920), American author and educator
 William W. Venable (1880–1948), American lawyer and national politician

Other
 Venable, Missouri, a community in the United States
 Venable, Ohio, a ghost town
 Venable LLP, a U.S. law firm
 Venable, a hotel that became the Hamilton Hotel (Portland, Oregon)
 Venable Mound, an archaeological site in Louisiana, USA

See also
 Venables (surname)